Featureless Men (Egyptian Arabic: رجال بلا ملامح translit: Regal bila Malameh aliases: Faceless Men) is a 1972 Egyptian film directed by Mahmoud Zulfikar. The film stars Salah Zulfikar and Nadia Lutfi. 

The film was shot in 1970, released in theaters in 1972. It is Mahmoud Zulfikar’s final film and was released posthumously.

Synopsis 
The events revolve around (Ahmed) who just finished his college in engineering. He gets to know the night girl, (Laila), and falls in love with her and tells his father that he'll marry her. But his father refuses as she's not at his social level and threatens him and events escalate.

Main cast 

 Salah Zulfikar as Ahmed Fouad
 Nadia Lutfi as Laila
 Mahmoud El-Meliguy as Ahmed's father, Fouad Omran
 Aida Kamel as Ferdoos
 Suhair Fakhri as Amina Kamel
 Seham Fathy as Tooha
 Badr Nofal as Hosni
 Toukhi Tawfik as Lamai
 Ezz El-Dine Islam as Shaker

References

External links 
 Featureless Men on elCinema

1970s Arabic-language films
1972 films
1972 romantic drama films
Egyptian romantic drama films
Films shot in Egypt